The 1999 London Broncos season was the twentieth in the club's history and their fourth season in the Super League. The Broncos had three coaches over the course of the season, competing in Super League IV and finishing in 8th place. The club also made their maiden appearance in the final of the Challenge Cup.

1999 squad statistics

Sources: 1999 Squad

Super League IV table

Source:

1999 Challenge Cup
The London Broncos progressed to the Final of the Cup, before losing to the Leeds Rhinos by 52–16 at the Old Wembley Stadium in London.

References

External links
London Broncos - Rugby League Project
Challenge Cup official website
Sport: Rugby League Challenge Cup teams and profiles

London Broncos seasons
London Broncos